Night of the Furies is The Rosebuds' third album, released April 10, 2007 on Merge Records.

Track listing
 "My Punishment for Fighting"
 "Cemetery Lawns"
 "I Better Run"
 "Get Up Get Out"
 "Silence by the Lakeside"
 "Hold on to This Coat"
 "Silja Line"
 "When the Lights Went Dim"
 "Night of the Furies"

External links
Night of the Furies release info from MergeRecords.com

The Rosebuds albums
2007 albums
Merge Records albums